Castle Peak is a 10,190-foot (3110 meter) mountain summit located in the Wrangell Mountains, in the U.S. state of Alaska. Precipitation runoff from the mountain drains into Kuskulana River and Lakina River which are both tributaries of the Chitina River. The peak's descriptive name was used by early prospectors as reported in 1901 by the US Geological Survey.

Climate

Based on the Köppen climate classification, Castle Peak is located in a subarctic climate zone with long, cold, snowy winters, and cool summers. Winds coming off the Gulf of Alaska are forced upwards by the Wrangell Mountains (orographic lift), causing precipitation in the form of rainfall and snowfall. Temperatures can drop below −20 °F with wind chill factors below −30 °F. The months May through June offer the most favorable weather for viewing and climbing.

See also

List of mountain peaks of Alaska
Geography of Alaska

References

Gallery

External links
 Castle Peak: Mountain Forecast
 Weather forecast: Castle Peak

Landforms of Copper River Census Area, Alaska
Mountains of Alaska
Wrangell–St. Elias National Park and Preserve